John Hubbell may refer to:

Don Lorenzo Hubbell (1853–1930), born John Lorenzo Hubbell, trader, politician
John H. Hubbell (1925–2007), radiation physicist
John Raymond Hubbell (1879–1954), composer
John Hubbell (figure skater) (born 1948), Canadian pair skater
John W. Hubbell American bridge player

See also
John Hubble (disambiguation)